Xincheng Township or Sincheng Township is a rural township located in north of Hualien County, Taiwan, and has a population of 20,308 inhabitants and 8 villages. It is also the smallest township in Hualien County.

History

Formerly called Toloboan.

Administrative divisions
The township comprises eight villages: Beipu, Dahan, Jiali, Jialin, Jiaxin, Kangle, Shunan and Xincheng.

Climate
 Subtropical monsoon and humid climate
 Average temperature: 
 Average precipitation:

Economy
The township is home to the cement mining operated by Asia Cement Corporation and its cement plant.

Education
 Dahan Institute of Technology

Tourist attractions
 Qixingtan Beach
 Chihsing Tan Katsuo Museum
 Tzu Chi Jing She (Temple of Tzu Chi Foundation)
 Asia Cement Ecological Park

Transportation

Air
 Hualien Airport

Rail
 TRA Beipu Station (North-link line)
 TRA Sincheng (Taroko) Station (North-link line)

Road
 Provincial Highway No.9
 County road No.193

Notable natives
 Wang Shin-lung, Commander of the Republic of China Army

References

External links

 Office of Xincheng Township(Chinese)

Townships in Hualien County